Osage Township is one of eleven townships in Camden County, Missouri, USA.  As of the 2010 census, its population was 4,945.

Osage Township was established in 1841, taking its name from the Osage River.

Geography
Osage Township borders Jasper Township to the north and west, Pawhuska Township to the east, Kiheka Township to the east, and Osceola Township to the southwest. 

It contains four cemeteries: Hall, Hopkins, Memorial and Old Erie.

The streams of Blue Springs Branch, Linn Creek, North Fork Linn Creek and South Fork Linn Creek run through this township.

Transportation
Osage Township contains two airports or landing strips: Hospital Property Heliport and Linn Creek-Grand Glaize Memorial Airport.

References

 USGS Geographic Names Information System (GNIS)

External links
 US-Counties.com
 City-Data.com

Townships in Camden County, Missouri
Townships in Missouri